Peter Thomas Barton (born July 19, 1956) is an American retired actor. He starred in The Powers of Matthew Star, with Louis Gossett Jr.; Burke's Law with Gene Barry; and the soap opera Sunset Beach.  Named one of the 10 sexiest guys in soaps by Playgirl, Barton is probably best known as Scott Grainger on the daytime drama The Young and the Restless.

Early life

Barton is originally from Valley Stream, Long Island, New York. He is a graduate of Valley Stream North High School, where he played soccer and wrestled. He attended nearby Nassau Community College. Although accepted into St. John's University School of Medicine, he changed his mind about attending. Just before signing up for classes, he decided to pursue a career in modeling and acting.

Career
Even though Barton had no formal acting training, in 1979 he starred as Bill Miller in the short-lived NBC TV series Shirley, starring Shirley Jones, Rosanna Arquette, and Tracey Gold. The show ran for 13 episodes. NBC still had him under contract at the end of 1980, and it connected him with prominent acting coach Vincent Chase, and when the series ended, he was cast as the lead in another NBC series, The Powers of Matthew Star.  He won the role over many actors, among them Tom Cruise.

In the 1980s, teen magazines were looking for the next big cover, and Barton was featured on many of them, including Tiger Beat and 16, typically in a sexy pose, shirtless.  He has also appeared on many TV shows such as The Fall Guy and The Love Boat and daytime soap operas like The Young and the Restless.

Barton saw his popularity dwindling by the end of 1983, and he "wanted to give up acting". However, he became involved in the burgeoning teen horror/thriller film genre, beginning with Hell Night (1981) and followed by Friday the 13th: The Final Chapter (1984).

 
After outgrowing his ability to appear as a teenager, Barton acquired mostly television roles as an adult. He starred on Burke's Law with Gene Barry and the soap opera Sunset Beach. His last appearance to date was in the 2005 film Repetition.

Personal life

On July 16, 2012, a man in Illinois named Ray Fulk died at age 71. Fulk, who had no family of his own, was a fan of Peter Barton and Barton's friend, Lucan star Kevin Brophy. Despite never having met either actor, Fulk bequeathed half of his $1.3m estate to each of the actors. The story of their good fortune was featured in Episode 103 of the TLC show Suddenly Rich.

Filmography

References

External links

1956 births
Living people
20th-century American male actors
21st-century American male actors
Male actors from New York (state)
American male film actors
American male television actors
American male soap opera actors
People from Valley Stream, New York
Valley Stream North High School alumni
Nassau Community College alumni